The 2017–18 Ranji Trophy was the 84th season of the Ranji Trophy, the first-class cricket tournament in India. It was contested by 28 teams divided into four groups, each containing seven teams. The top two teams from Group B progressed to the quarterfinals of the competition.

Defending champions Gujarat and Kerala progressed to the knockout stage of the competition after beating Jharkhand and Haryana respectively in the final round of group-stage fixtures. It was the first time that Kerala had progressed to the quarter-finals of the Ranji Trophy.

Teams
The following teams were placed in Group B, based on their average points in the previous three years:

 Gujarat
 Haryana
 Jammu & Kashmir
 Jharkhand
 Kerala
 Rajasthan
 Saurashtra

Points table

Fixtures

Round 1

Round 2

Round 3

Round 4

Round 5

Round 6

Round 7

References

Ranji Trophy seasons
Ranji Trophy Trophy
Ranji Trophy
Ranji Trophy